White Rabbit is a 2013 American psychological drama film directed by Tim McCann and starring Nick Krause, Sam Trammell and Britt Robertson. Written by Anthony Di Pietro, the film concerns a mentally-ill teen being bullied in high school, whose visions urge him to take revenge. It was produced by Robert Yocum (Burning Sky Films), Shaun Sanghani (SSS Entertainment) and Jacky Lee Morgan. It had its world premiere at the Zurich Film Festival and is being distributed in the United States by Breaking Glass Pictures.

Plot
Harlon Mackey has been tormented by visions since his alcoholic father forced him to kill an innocent rabbit while hunting as a boy. Now that Harlon is a bullied high school teen, his undiagnosed mental illness is getting worse. He begins to hear voices, and his imagination encourages him to carry out violent acts. Things begin to look up when Julie, a rebellious young girl, moves to town and befriends Harlon. But when she betrays him, the line between reality and Harlon's imagination begins to blur, and the rabbit along with other imaginary comic book characters taunt him into committing one final act of revenge.

Cast
Nick Krause as Harlon Mackey
Sam Trammell as Darrell Mackey
Britt Robertson as Julie
Ryan Lee as Steve
Josh Warren as Duane
Denise Williamson as Alice
Lawrence Turner as Harvey
Billy Slaughter as Dr. Clayton

Production
Principal photography began in August 2012 in Louisiana, United States for 21 days.

Music
White Rabbit: Original Motion Picture Score (composed by John Vincent McCauley) was released digitally on January 20, 2015.

Release
White Rabbit premiered on September 30, 2013 at the Zurich Film Festival. It was released theatrically and on video on demand in North America on February 13, 2015.

Accolades

References

External links

2013 films
2010s psychological drama films
American films about revenge
American psychological drama films
Films about bullying
Films about mass murder
Films about schizophrenia
American high school films
Films directed by Tim McCann
2013 drama films
Films shot in Louisiana
2010s English-language films
2010s American films